Hood film is a 1990s film genre originating in the United States, which features aspects of urban African American or Hispanic American culture. John Singleton, Mario Van Peebles, F. Gary Gray, Hughes Brothers, and Spike Lee are all directors who have created work typically classified as part of this genre. The genre has been identified as a sub-genre of the gangster film genre.

The genre has since spread outside the US, to places such as the UK and Canada.

Hood films have been variously described under a wide-array of names by critics, such as 'street-gang', 'ghetto-centric', 'action-crime-adventure', 'gangsta rap films', 'black action films', 'new black realism', 'new jack cinema', and 'black urban cinema'. Spike Lee disparagingly referred to the genre as 'hiphop, urban drama, ghetto film'.

Criteria
Characteristics include hip hop music (including gangsta rap), street gangs, racial discrimination, organized crime/gangster, gang affiliation scenes, drug use and trafficking, and the problems of young people coming of age or struggling amid the relative poverty and violent neighborhoods. Hood films tell predominantly masculine stories, however some films within the genre (such as Set It Off) have  women-focused stories.

British hood films also use music genres such as grime, and generally depict aspects of urban Black British culture, particularly within inner-city London.

Critical definitions
Critic Murray Forman notes that the "spatial logic" of hip-hop culture, with heavy emphasis on place-based identity, locates "black youth urban experience within an environment of continual proximate danger," and this quality defines the hood film. In a 1992 essay in Cineaction, Canadian critic Rinaldo Walcott identified the hood film's primary concerns as issues of masculinity and "(re)gaining manhood for black men."

History

Early notable releases in the hood film genre include Colors (1988) and Do the Right Thing (1989). The latter in particular has been credited with ushering in the hood film zeitgeist in the 90s due to its popular success.

Critics such as Murray Forman have credited the popular emergence of hood-films with the simultaneous emergence of gangsta rap as a popular music genre in the 1990s, wherein the hood film genre reached the height of its popularity due to the acclaim of the films New Jack City, Boyz n the Hood, Juice, the Sundance-winning Straight Out of Brooklyn and Menace II Society. Gangsta rap and hood films formed a symbiotic relationship, and many rappers of the era appeared in popular hood films at the time. With the plethora of films both dramas and comedies, hood films of the 1990s are in a sense neo-Blaxploitation films and Mexploitation films.<ref>{{Cite web |url=http://www.lib.berkeley.edu/MRC/MenaceII.html |title="Menace II Society" – Cineaste |access-date=2006-08-17 |archive-date=2006-09-08 |archive-url=https://web.archive.org/web/20060908014335/http://www.lib.berkeley.edu/MRC/MenaceII.html |url-status=live }}</ref> The genre has also been parodied with such films as Don't Be a Menace to South Central While Drinking Your Juice in the Hood and Friday.

By the mid-1990s, the hood film popular zeitgeist largely came to an end, however, hood films would continue to be released through the late 90s and 2000s, albeit on a smaller scale and poorer box-office results. These hood films often have low production costs. Celeste A. Fisher credited this decline to general fatigue felt towards the genre, due to the lack of diversity in "images, settings, and themes". Many low-budget, straight-to-dvd hood films were released in the late 90s and through the 2000s, such as I'm Bout It, Leprechaun in the Hood and Hood of the Living Dead. Many of these films stripped back the social and political messaging that was present in their 90s forebears, while continuing to capitalise on the 'hood film' formula.

On the contrary, while hood films were falling out of popularity in the United States, it would experience a brief popular emergence in the UK led by British filmmakers such as Noel Clarke. Bullet Boy, released in 2004, is generally recognised to be the first notable example of a British hood film. Kidulthood, released in 2006, is credited with popularising the British hood film genre, leading to a swathe of imitators in the years following. By the mid-2010s, the British hood film genre largely faded out of mainstream popularity, however, a TV series which carried heavy influences from the genre, Top Boy, gained international acclaim during this period.

The mid-2010s saw a small revival of the genre, with popular releases such as Girlhood and Straight Outta Compton. This wave of hood films was dubbed a 'rebirth' of the genre by Dazed.

 Criticism 
Hood films have received criticism for alleged glorification of criminality and gangsterism. The genre has also been criticised for perpetuating the idea that young, black males are violent, sexist, or gangsters, despite the well-meaning intent behind some films within the genre to bring awareness to issues such as poverty, political alienation and the varying effects of institutional racism. Norman K. Denzin explained:These realistic social-problem texts fuelled conservative racist discourse. They helped fearful white Americans blame blacks for the problems of the inner city. They suggested that blacks caused their own problems. The problems of the ghetto were not shared by the larger society.Research findings have noted that positive representations of women in the genre are almost non-existent, and women are often depicted in degrading roles.

Legacy
The Academy Award-nominated classics Do the Right Thing and Boyz n the Hood were each inducted into the National Film Registry.

The latter film topped the "Top Black Films of All Times" poll from the November 1998 edition of Ebony'' magazine.

See also
 African American cinema
 African-American neighborhood
 L.A. Rebellion-alternative independent black cinema during the 70s-90s
 Message picture
 Social realism

References

African-American culture
Film genres
 
1970s in film
1980s in film
1990s in film
2000s in film
2010s in film
2020s in film
Latin American culture